Roscoe Conkling Patterson (September 15, 1876October 22, 1954) was an American lawyer from Missouri. He was most notable for his service as a United States representative (1921–1923) and a U.S. Senator (1929–1935).

Early life
Patterson was born in Springfield, Missouri on September 15, 1876.  He attended public and private schools, Drury College, (Springfield) and the University of Missouri in Columbia. He graduated from Washington University School of Law in St. Louis in 1897, was admitted to the bar later that year, and commenced practice in Springfield.

Start of career
From 1903 to 1907, Patterson served as prosecuting attorney of Greene County. In 1912, Patterson was appointed to the Missouri Republican State Committee, and he served until 1920.

Patterson was elected to the United States House of Representatives in 1920 and served in the 67th Congress, March 4, 1921 to March 3, 1923. He was an unsuccessful candidate for reelection in 1922 and resumed the practice of law in Springfield. He was a presidential elector in 1924.

From 1925 to 1929, Patterson resided in Kansas City, Missouri and was United States district attorney for the western district of Missouri. He resigned in February 1929 in preparation to assume the seat in the United States Senate to which he was elected in November 1928.

U.S. Senate
Patterson won the general election in November 1928. He took his Senate seat the following year and served one term, March 4, 1929 to January 3, 1935. While in the Senate, he was chairman of the Committee on Mines and Mining (72nd Congress). His chief legislative accomplishment was sponsorship of the Lindbergh Law, which enabled federal authorities to investigate kidnappings if the victims were transported across state lines.

Patterson served during the Great Depression, which was largely blamed on Republican economic policies. He consistently opposed the New Deal remedies of President Franklin D. Roosevelt, which made him unpopular in Missouri. As a result, Patterson was an unsuccessful candidate for reelection in the 1934 election, losing the general election to the Democratic nominee, Harry S. Truman.

Later career
After leaving the Senate, Patterson resumed the practice of law in Springfield. For several years, Patterson was a member of the Missouri Appellate Judicial Commission.

Death and burial
Patterson suffered a stroke in July 1954. His health deteriorated and he died in Springfield on October 22, 1954. He was buried at Maple Park Cemetery in Springfield.

Family
Patterson was married to Ada Holman of Springfield (1877–1957). They were the parents of two children, Paul (1902–1924) and Hadley (1908–1958).

References

Sources

Books

Newspapers

External links

Gallery of Past U.S. Attorneys for the Western District of Missouri at United States Attorneys Office for the Western District of Missouri

1876 births
1954 deaths
1924 United States presidential electors
Politicians from Springfield, Missouri
Washington University School of Law alumni
University of Missouri alumni
United States Attorneys for the Western District of Missouri
Republican Party United States senators from Missouri
Republican Party members of the United States House of Representatives from Missouri
Old Right (United States)
Washington University in St. Louis alumni